Wysoka   is a village in the administrative district of Gmina Działdowo, within Działdowo County, Warmian-Masurian Voivodeship, in northern Poland.

It has a population of 380.

References

Villages in Działdowo County